Wendy Mitchinson (1947-2021) was a Canadian historian at the University of Waterloo and a Canada Research Chair in Gender and Medical history.

Mitchinson trained at York University and quickly became a major figure in the field of Canadian women's history. With Ramsay Cook, she co-edited her first book "The Proper Sphere: Woman's Place in Canadian Society", a collection of writing on the then new field of Canadian women's history. In 1988, she co-authored "Canadian Women: A History" the first textbook on Canadian women. She joined the University of Waterloo with tenure in 1985, and continued as a professor emerita after her 2013 retirement.

Later, she begin to focus on the history of medicine, particularly women's health, and wrote "The Nature of Their Bodies: Women and Their Doctors in Victorian Canada." Her most recent book, "Giving Birth in Canada: 1900-1950", examines the history of childbirth in a Canadian context. She held the Canada Research Chair in Gender and Medical History from 2006 to 2013, and published Fighting Fat: Canada 1920-1980 in 2018.

She was awarded two Royal Society of Canada Jason A. Hannah medals for publication in the history of medicine, and 2013 University of Waterloo's Award of Excellence in Graduate Supervision.

See also
 List of University of Waterloo people

References

Selected bibliography
"H. B. Atlee on Obstetrics and Gynaecology:  A Representative and Singular Voice in 20th Century Canadian Medicine," Acadiensis 32, 2 (Spring 2003):  1-28.
"Giving Birth in Canada, 1900-1950."  (Toronto:  University of Toronto Press, 2002).
"The Impact of Feminism on the Research and Writing of Medical History: A Personal View,"  Atlantis 25..2 (Spring/Summer 2001):  93-100.
"The Sometimes Uncertain World of Canadian Obstetrics, 1900 to 1950," The Canadian Bulletin of Medical History, 17, 1-2 (2000):  103-208.
"On the Case: Explorations in Social History", with Franca Iacovetta (Toronto: University of Toronto Press ss1998).
"The nature of their bodies: women and their doctors in Victorian Canada" (Toronto: University of Toronto Press, 1991)
"Essays in the history of Canadian medicine", with Janice P. Dickin (Toronto: McClelland and Stewart, 1988)
"Canadian Women: a History" with Alison Prentice, Paula Bourne, Gail Cuthbert Brandt, Beth Light, and Naomi Black. (Harcourt Brace Jovanovich, 1988)

External links
Biography at the Tri-University History Program

Living people
20th-century Canadian historians
Gender studies academics
Historians of Canada
Academic staff of the University of Waterloo
Canada Research Chairs
Women's historians
1947 births
21st-century Canadian historians